Taking Over is the second studio album by thrash metal band Overkill, released in March 1987 through Atlantic and Megaforce Records. The album is Overkill's last to feature drummer Rat Skates, who left the band later in 1987 and was replaced by Sid Falck. It was also the first to be released through Atlantic, who would release all of the band's albums up to W.F.O. (1994).

Touring and promotion
Overkill toured for less than a year to promote Taking Over. In March–April 1987, they opened for Helloween on their Keeper of the Seven Keys: Part I tour in Europe, and supported Megadeth on their Wake Up Dead Tour in May–June. Overkill then headlined their own shows in July–August, with Testament opening.

"Wrecking Crew" and "In Union We Stand" have been played live at almost every Overkill show to date, with the former being considered one of the band's signature songs, as well as being the title of their official website (wreckingcrew.com).

Reception

John Book at AllMusic gave Taking Over four stars out of five, saying "This New York band got a lot of attention with this album, although looking back at it, the vocals of Bobby "Blitz" Ellsworth are somewhat dreadful compared to how they sound now." The album was Overkill's first to chart on the U.S. Billboard 200, reaching No. 191 and remaining on that chart for a week; it remains the band's second lowest chart position to date. In 2005, Taking Over was ranked No. 450 in Rock Hard magazine's book of The 500 Greatest Rock & Metal Albums of All Time.

Track listing

Personnel
Bobby "Blitz" Ellsworth – vocals
D. D. Verni – bass
Bobby Gustafson – guitars
Rat Skates – drums

Additional personnel
Overkill – production
Alex Perialas – engineering, mixing, production
Tom Coyne – mastering
Stephen Innocenzi – mastering (CD edition)
Jon Zazula – executive production
Bill Benson – cover painting

Chart performance

References

Overkill (band) albums
1987 albums
Atlantic Records albums
Megaforce Records albums